Kjell Carlsson (1918–1993) was a Swedish international speedway rider.

Speedway career 
Carlsson reached the final of the Speedway World Championship in the 1955 Individual Speedway World Championship. He rode in the top tier of Swedish Speedway, riding for various clubs, and reached the 1950 Swedish final.

World final appearances
 1955 —  London, Wembley Stadium — 13th-3pts

References 

1918 births
1993 deaths
Swedish speedway riders